The Shanghai Drama is a 1938 French drama film directed by G. W. Pabst and starring Christl Mardayn, Louis Jouvet and Raymond Rouleau. An exiled White Russian woman works as a cabaret singer in Shanghai to support her daughter through school. The film's sets were designed by the art directors Andrej Andrejew and Guy de Gastyne. It was shot at the Joinville Studios in Paris and on location in Saigon in French Indochina.

Cast
 Raymond Rouleau as Franchon
 Louis Jouvet as Ivan
 Christl Mardayn as Kay Murphy, cabaret singer 
 Elina Labourdette as Nana, the nurse
 Valéry Inkijinoff as Black Dragon Agent
 Dorville as Bill, cabaret owner
 André Alerme as Mac Tavish 
 Suzanne Desprès as Vera
 Gabrielle Dorziat as Superintendent of school
 Marcel Lupovici as Assassin for Black Dragon
 Robert Manuel as Le client attaqué
 PierreasLouis as Un marin américain
 LinhasNam as Cheng
 FounasSen as Wife of Black Dragon Agent
 Mila Parély as Dancing Girl

See also
A Countess from Hong Kong (1967)
The White Countess (2005)

References

Bibliography
 Kennedy-Karpat, Colleen. Rogues, Romance, and Exoticism in French Cinema of the 1930s. Fairleigh Dickinson, 2013.

External links

1938 films
1938 drama films
1930s French-language films
French black-and-white films
Films directed by G. W. Pabst
Films based on Belgian novels
Films set in Hong Kong
Films set in Shanghai
Films shot at Joinville Studios
Films shot in Vietnam
French drama films
Second Sino-Japanese War films
1930s French films